Tzigane is a rhapsodic composition by the French composer Maurice Ravel. It was commissioned by and dedicated to Hungarian violinist Jelly d'Arányi, great-niece of the influential violin virtuoso Joseph Joachim. The original instrumentation was for violin and piano (with optional luthéal attachment). The first performance took place in London on April 26, 1924 with the dedicatee on violin and with Henri Gil-Marchex at the piano (with luthéal).

The luthéal was, in Ravel's day, a new piano attachment (first patented in 1919) with several tone-colour registrations which could be engaged by pulling stops above the keyboard. One of these registrations had a cimbalom-like sound, which fitted well with the gypsy-esque idea of the composition. The original score of Tzigane included instructions for these register-changes during execution. The luthéal, however, did not achieve permanence. By the end of the 20th century the first print of the accompaniment with luthéal was still available at the publishers, but by that time the attachment had long since disappeared from use.

Ravel soon orchestrated the piano part, and the version for violin and orchestra was first performed in Amsterdam on 19 October 1924, with Pierre Monteux conducting the Concertgebouw and Samuel Dushkin as soloist. On 30 November 1924 the Paris premiere featured Jelly d'Arányi and the Concerts Colonne under the direction of Gabriel Pierné. The first performance of the version with piano without luthéal was by Robert Soetens in 1925.

The name of the piece is derived from the generic European term for "gypsy" (in French: gitan, tsigane or tzigane rather than the Hungarian cigány) although it does not use any authentic Gypsy melodies. Note that in Ravel's days in Paris gypsy/gitan/tsigane/tzigane did not so much refer to the Roma (Gypsy) people in any strict sense: the "gypsy" style of the work was rather a kind of popular musical exoticism, comparable to the Spanish exoticism in Wagner's day (compare Emmanuel Chabrier's España), or the Janissary exoticism in Mozart's day (Rondo alla Turca).

The composition is in one movement, with an approximate duration of ten minutes. Though the composer is usually regarded as following an Impressionist idiom, Tzigane clearly demonstrates Ravel's ability to imitate the (late) Romantic style of violin showmanship promoted by such composer-virtuosi as Paganini and Sarasate.

References

Further reading

External links

Tzigane: Movie

Compositions by Maurice Ravel
1924 compositions
Rhapsodies
Music commissioned by ensembles or performers
Music dedicated to ensembles or performers
Compositions for violin and orchestra